The 2005 Grand Valley State Lakers football team was an American football team that won the 2005 NCAA Division II national championship.

The team represented the Grand Valley State University in the Great Lakes Intercollegiate Athletic Conference (GLIAC) during the 2005 NCAA Division II football season. In their second season under head coach Chuck Martin, the Lakers compiled a perfect 13–0 record (9–0 against conference opponents), outscored opponents by a total of 434 to 159, and won the GLIAC championship. The team advanced to the playoffs and won the national championship by defeating  in the championship game.

The team played its home games at Lubbers Stadium in Allendale Charter Township, Michigan.

Schedule

References

Grand Valley State
Grand Valley State Lakers football seasons
Great Lakes Intercollegiate Athletic Conference football champion seasons
NCAA Division II Football Champions
College football undefeated seasons
Grand Valley State Lakers football